Kazair West was an airline based in Atyrau, Kazakhstan, which operated domestic corporate charter flights out of Atyrau Airport, as well as aviation project management and medical evacuation services.

History
The airline was established and started operations in 1996. It was registered as a shared stock company with foreign participation, represented by Cliftondale Aviation, a United States company. On 13 July 2009, Kazair West was included in the List of air carriers banned in the European Union, along with most other Kazakh airlines due to the poor maintenance standards in the country. On 18 October 2010, it had its airline license revoked and ceased all operations.

Fleet
In 2010, the Kazair West fleet consisted of the following aircraft:
2 Let L-410 UVP-E
1 Tupolev Tu-134B
2 Yakovlev Yak-40

References

External links

Defunct airlines of Kazakhstan
Airlines established in 1996
Airlines disestablished in 2010